is a small Mars crossing asteroid roughly  in diameter. It was first observed by astronomers with the Pan-STARRS survey at Haleakala Observatory on 14 June 2018. It was removed from the Sentry Risk Table on 29 July 2021. With an observation arc of 15 years the orbit is very well known and it does not make any notable approaches to Earth.

In November 2018, when the asteroid had an almost worthless observation arc of 1.8 days, news article headlines exaggerated claims of 62 potentially dangerous Earth-orbit crossings in the next century but also reported NASA calculations indicating there was only a 1 in 30,000,000 chance of impact. Additionally,  was rated at 0 on the Torino Scale, meaning that the chance of impact was so low as to effectively be zero. The observation arc extended only 1.8 days, leaving large uncertainties in its predicted motion, causing  to be considered a lost asteroid.

It will pass  from Mars on 6 July 2027.

References

External links
 
 
 

Minor planet object articles (unnumbered)

Near-Earth objects removed from the Sentry Risk Table
20180614